Francis Keita (born 23 July 1970) is a Sierra Leonean sprinter. He competed in the 4 × 100 metres relay at the 1988 Summer Olympics and the 1992 Summer Olympics.

References

1970 births
Living people
Athletes (track and field) at the 1988 Summer Olympics
Athletes (track and field) at the 1992 Summer Olympics
Sierra Leonean male sprinters
Sierra Leonean male long jumpers
Olympic athletes of Sierra Leone
Place of birth missing (living people)